Cynthia Ligeard ( Parage; born 15 June 1962) is a New Caledonian anti-independence politician. She was the second woman to serve as President of the Government of New Caledonia, a position she held from 5 June 2014 until 1 April 2015. (Marie-Noëlle Thémereau was the first female President of New Caledonia from 2004 to 2007).

Biography 

Ligeard was born Cynthia Parage in Nouméa, New Caledonia, on 15 June 1962. She is a caldoche, or New Caledonian of French descent.

The 2014 New Caledonian legislative election were held on 11 May 2014.  Cynthia Ligeard was elected President of the Government of New Caledonia by Congress on 5 June 2014. She headed a coalition of anti-independence New Caledonian political parties in Congress. However, Ligeard's government lasted just six months before its collapse in December 2014 due to a dispute between the anti-independence coalition parties over finances and fiscal issues. Philippe Germain of Caledonia Together succeeded her as president on 1 April 2015.

References 

Living people
1962 births
Presidents of the Government of New Caledonia
Members of the Congress of New Caledonia
New Caledonian women in politics
The Rally (New Caledonia) politicians
Union for a Popular Movement politicians
People from Nouméa
New Caledonian people of French descent
21st-century French women politicians